The 1913 Ottawa Rough Riders finished in 2nd place in the Interprovincial Rugby Football Union with a 4–2 record and failed to qualify for the playoffs.

Regular season

Standings

Schedule

(*) The October 18 game versus Toronto that ended in a tie was replayed on Nov 15 and did not count towards the standings.

References

Ottawa Rough Riders seasons